HMS Bentley  was a  which served during World War II. The ship was named after Sir John Bentley who entered the Royal Navy in 1720. Between 1744 and 1761 he commanded a series of ships and took part in the decisive victory at the Battle of Quiberon Bay in 1759 while commanding a 74-gun third-rate ship of the line .

Originally destined for the US Navy as a turbo-electric (TE) type , HMS Bentley was provisionally given the name USS Ebert (later this name was reassigned to DE 768) however the delivery was diverted to the Royal Navy before the launch.

Construction and design
The  was one of six classes of destroyer escorts built for the US Navy to meet the massive demand for escort vessels following America's entry into World War Two. While basically similar, the different classes were fitted with different propulsion gear and armament. The Buckleys had a turbo-electric drive, and a main gun armament of 3-inch guns.

Displacement was  standard and  full load. Two boilers fed steam to steam turbines which drove electrical generators, with in turn powered electric motors that propelled the ship.

The ship's main gun armament consisted of three 3-inch (76 mm) 50 caliber dual-purpose (i.e. anti-surface and anti-aircraft) guns, two forward and one aft, in open mounts. Close in armament consisted of two 40 mm Bofors guns, backed up by eight single Oerlikon 20 mm cannon. A triple mount of 21-inch (533 mm) torpedo tubes provided a capability against larger ships, while anti-submarine armament consisted of a Hedgehog forward-firing anti-submarine mortar and four depth charge throwers and two depth charge rails. Crew was 200 officers and other ranks.

DE 74 was laid down at Bethlehem Shipbuilding Corporation's Hingham Shipyard, in Hingham, Massachusetts on 26 April 1943. She was originally planned to serve with the US Navy with the name Ebert, but was allocated to Great Britain under the Lend Lease programme on 10 July 1943. The ship was launched as HMS Bentley on 17 July 1943 and commissioned in the Royal Navy, with the pennant number K465, on 13 October 1943.

Service

HMS Bentley served exclusively with the 1st Escort Group taking part in operations in the North Atlantic.

On 18 February 1944, the German submarine  torpedoed and sunk the Panamanian merchant ship Colin in the North Atlantic. The next day, Bentley and sister ship  rescued the 54 survivors from Colin. In June 1944, the Allies invaded Normandy, and the 1st Escort Group, including Bentley, was one of six Escort Groups deployed to form a barrier about 130 miles west of Lands End to prevent German U-boats based in the French Atlantic ports from interfering with the landings. In December 1944, Bentley remained part of the 1st Escort Group, based at Belfast and operating at the western end of the Channel. By March–April 1945, the 1st Escort Group, still including Bentley was operating out of Portsmouth against German submarines in the Channel.

Disposal
Following the end of the war, ships supplied to the Royal Navy under Lend Lease were soon returned to the United States, with Bentley being returned to United States Navy control on 5 November 1945. The ship was stricken from the US Naval Vessel Register on 15 December 1945 and sold for scrap to John J. Witte of Staten Island on 17 July 1947.

Notes

References

Bibliography

External links
 Uboat.net page for HMS Bentley
 Uboat.net page for U-859
 captainclassfrigates.co.uk

Captain-class frigates
Buckley-class destroyer escorts
World War II frigates of the United Kingdom
Ships built in Hingham, Massachusetts
1943 ships